The following are the Pakistan national under-23 football team results in its international matches.

2010

2012

2014

2015

2018

Notes

References 

u23
National under-23 association football team results